This is a listing of all the animated shorts released by Warner Bros. under the Looney Tunes and Merrie Melodies banners between 1930 and 1939, plus the pilot film from 1929 which was used to sell the Looney Tunes series to Leon Schlesinger and Warner Bros. A total of 270 shorts were released during the 1930s.

1929 
Bosko, the Talk-Ink Kid is a live-action/animated short film starring a character named Bosko. The film was produced in May 1929, directed by Hugh Harman and Rudolf Ising, and shown by the two to various distributors. In the film, a cartoonist (portrayed in live-action by Rudolf Ising) draws Bosko, who comes to life. Bosko speaks, sings, dances and plays the piano before the cartoonist sucks him into his ink pen and pours him back into the inkwell. Bosko pops out of the bottle and promises to return. The film is in the public domain.

The film was first made viewable to the public on Cartoon Network's television special Toonheads: The Lost Cartoons on March 12, 2000, in an edited form. The full cartoon is present on disc 4 of the Looney Tunes Golden Collection: Volume 1 as a special feature.

1930 
All cartoons are Looney Tunes starring Bosko and are all directed and produced by Hugh Harman and Rudolf Ising, along with Leon Schlesinger as associate producer. All cartoons are scored by Frank Marsales. All cartoons are in the public domain.

1931 
This year marks the debut of the Merrie Melodies series. All Merrie Melodies cartoons are directed by Rudolf Ising, and all Looney Tunes cartoons after The Tree's Knees are directed by Hugh Harman. The cartoons star Bosko, Foxy, Piggy, and other characters. All the cartoons are scored by Frank Marsales. All cartoons are in the public domain.

1932 
All cartoons are directed by Hugh Harman or Rudolf Ising. All cartoons are scored by Frank Marsales.

1933 
All cartoons through Buddy's Day Out are scored by Frank Marsales.

1934 
This year marks the beginning of production of color WB cartoons. For this year, most would still be in black and white up until Rhythm in the Bow. All cartoons are under copyright.

1935 
All Merrie Melodies cartoons are in 2-strip Technicolor until the end of the year, when the series adopts 3-strip Technicolor as its new color process, starting with Flowers for Madame.

1936 
This year, the Merrie Melodies series adopts the iconic bullseye rings in its opening titles alongside a script "That's all Folks!" text starting with I Wanna Play House and later the "Merrily We Roll Along" theme song starting with Boulevardier from the Bronx.

1937 
Starting this year, the Looney Tunes series adopts The Merry-Go-Round Broke Down theme song starting with Rover's Rival.

1938

1939

Further reading 
 Looney Tunes and Merrie Melodies: A Complete Illustrated Guide to the Warner Bros. Cartoons, by Jerry Beck and Will Friedwald (1989), Henry Holt, 
 Chuck Amuck : the Life and Times of an Animated Cartoonist by Chuck Jones, published by Farrar Straus & Giroux, 
 That's Not All, Folks! by Mel Blanc, Philip Bashe. Warner Books,  (Softcover)  (hardcover)
 Of Mice and Magic: A History of American Animated Cartoons, Leonard Maltin, Revised Edition 1987, Plume  (Softcover)  (hardcover)

References

External links 
 Official Looney Tunes site
 Big Cartoon DataBase entry for Merrie Melodies Cartoons and for Looney Tunes Cartoons
 Golden Age Cartoons' The Ultimate Looney Tunes and Merrie Melodies Website by Jon Cooke

1929 in American cinema
1930s in American cinema
Articles containing video clips
 
 
Warner Bros. Cartoons